Alina Ivanova (born August 3, 1995) is a Belarusian female acrobatic gymnast. With partners Iryna Maiseyenka and Yuliya Ardziakova, Ivanova competed in the 2014 Acrobatic Gymnastics World Championships.

References

External links 

 

1995 births
Living people
Belarusian acrobatic gymnasts
Female acrobatic gymnasts
Place of birth missing (living people)
21st-century Belarusian women